The 79th United States Congress was a meeting of the legislative branch of the United States federal government, composed of the United States Senate and the United States House of Representatives. It met in Washington, D.C., from January 3, 1945, to January 3, 1947, during the last months of Franklin D. Roosevelt's presidency, and the first two years of Harry Truman's presidency. The apportionment of seats in this House of Representatives was based on the 1940 United States census.

Both chambers had a Democratic majority (including increasing their edge in the House).  With the reelection of President Franklin D. Roosevelt to a record fourth term, the Democrats maintained an overall federal government trifecta.

Major events

 January 20, 1945: President Franklin D. Roosevelt began his fourth term.
 April 12, 1945: President Roosevelt died, Vice President Harry S. Truman became President of the United States.
 September 2, 1945: World War II ended.
 September 11, 1945 – June 20, 1946: Joint Committee on the Investigation of the Pearl Harbor Attack conducted its investigation and issued a report.
 November 6, 1946: 1946 United States Senate elections, 1946 United States House of Representatives elections: Republicans gained control of both houses.
 January 3, 1947: Proceedings of the U.S. Congress were televised for the first time.

Major legislation

 March 9, 1945: McCarran-Ferguson Act
 July 31, 1945: Bretton Woods Agreements Act, 
 July 31, 1945: Export-Import Bank Act of 1945
 December 20, 1945: United Nations Participation Act, 
 December 28, 1945: War Brides Act
 February 18, 1946: Rescission Act of 1946, 
 February 20, 1946: Employment Act, ch. 33, 
 May 13, 1946: Federal Airport Act of 1946, 
 June 4, 1946: Richard B. Russell National School Lunch Act, ch. 281, 
 June 11, 1946: Administrative Procedure Act, ch. 324, 
 July 2, 1946: Luce–Celler Act of 1946, 
 July 3, 1946: Hobbs Anti-Racketeering Act, ch. 537, 
 July 5, 1946: Lanham Trademark Act of 1946, 
 August 1, 1946: United States Atomic Energy Act of 1946, ch. 724, 
 August 2, 1946: Legislative Reorganization Act of 1946, including Title III: Federal Regulation of Lobbying Act of 1946, Title IV: Federal Tort Claims Act, and Title V: General Bridge Act
 August 13, 1946: Foreign Service Act, ch. 957, titles I–X, 
 August 13, 1946: Hospital Survey and Construction Act (Hill-Burton Act), ch. 958,

Treaties ratified 
 July 4, 1946: Senate ratified the Treaty of Manila, which gave independence to the Philippines.

Party summary

Senate

House of Representatives

Leadership

Senate 
 President:
 Henry A. Wallace (D), until January 20, 1945
 Harry S. Truman (D), January 20, 1945 – April 12, 1945; thereafter vacant
 President Pro Tempore: Kenneth McKellar (D)
 Majority leader: Alben W. Barkley (D)
 Minority leader: Wallace H. White Jr. (R, acting)
 Majority whip: J. Lister Hill (D)
 Minority whip: Kenneth S. Wherry (R), elected 1944

House of Representatives
 Speaker: Sam Rayburn (D)
 Majority leader: John W. McCormack (D)
 Minority leader: Joseph W. Martin Jr. (R)
 Majority whip: John Sparkman (D)
 Minority whip: Leslie C. Arends (R)

Members

Senate
Senators are popularly elected statewide every two years, with one-third beginning new six-year terms with each Congress. Preceding the names in the list below are Senate class numbers, which indicate the cycle of their election, In this Congress, Class 1 meant their term ended with this Congress, facing re-election in 1946; Class 2 meant their term began in the last Congress, facing re-election in 1948; and Class 3 meant their term began in this Congress, facing re-election in 1950.

Alabama 
 2. John H. Bankhead II (D), until June 12, 1946
 George R. Swift (D), June 15, 1946 – November 5, 1946
 John Sparkman (D), from November 6, 1946
 3. J. Lister Hill (D)

Arizona 
 1. Ernest McFarland (D)
 3. Carl Hayden (D)

Arkansas 
 2. John L. McClellan (D)
 3. J. William Fulbright (D)

California 
 1. Hiram Johnson (R), until August 6, 1945
 William Knowland (R), from August 26, 1945
 3. Sheridan Downey (D)

Colorado 
 2. Edwin C. Johnson (D)
 3. Eugene Millikin (R)

Connecticut 
 1. Francis T. Maloney (D), until January 16, 1945
 Thomas C. Hart (R), February 15, 1945 – November 5, 1946
 Raymond E. Baldwin (R), from December 27, 1946
 3. Brien McMahon (D)

Delaware 
 1. James M. Tunnell (D)
 2. C. Douglass Buck (R)

Florida 
 1. Charles O. Andrews (D), until September 18, 1946
 Spessard Holland (D), from September 25, 1946
 3. Claude Pepper (D)

Georgia 
 2. Richard Russell Jr. (D)
 3. Walter F. George (D)

Idaho 
 2. John W. Thomas (R), until November 10, 1945
 Charles C. Gossett (D), November 17, 1945 – November 6, 1946
 Henry Dworshak (R), from November 6, 1946
 3. Glen H. Taylor (D)

Illinois 
 2. Charles W. Brooks (R)
 3. Scott W. Lucas (D)

Indiana 
 1. Raymond E. Willis (R)
 3. Homer E. Capehart (R)

Iowa 
 2. George A. Wilson (R)
 3. Bourke B. Hickenlooper (R)

Kansas 
 2. Arthur Capper (R)
 3. Clyde M. Reed (R)

Kentucky 
 2. Happy Chandler (D), until November 1, 1945
 William A. Stanfill (R), November 19, 1945 – November 5, 1946
 John Sherman Cooper (R), from November 6, 1946
 3. Alben W. Barkley (D)

Louisiana 
 2. Allen J. Ellender (D)
 3. John H. Overton (D)

Maine 
 1. Owen Brewster (R)
 2. Wallace H. White Jr. (R)

Maryland 
 1. George L. P. Radcliffe (D)
 3. Millard Tydings (D)

Massachusetts 
 1. David I. Walsh (D)
 2. Leverett Saltonstall (R)

Michigan 
 1. Arthur Vandenberg (R)
 2. Homer S. Ferguson (R)

Minnesota 
 1. Henrik Shipstead (R)
 2. Joseph H. Ball (R)

Mississippi 
 1. Theodore G. Bilbo (D)
 2. James Eastland (D)

Missouri 
 1. Harry S. Truman (D), until January 17, 1945
 Frank P. Briggs (D), from January 18, 1945
 3. Forrest C. Donnell (R)

Montana 
 1. Burton K. Wheeler (D)
 2. James E. Murray (D)

Nebraska 
 1. Hugh A. Butler (R)
 2. Kenneth S. Wherry (R)

Nevada 
 1. James G. Scrugham (D), until June 23, 1945
 Edward P. Carville (D), from July 25, 1945
 3. Pat McCarran (D)

New Hampshire 
 2. Styles Bridges (R)
 3. Charles W. Tobey (R)

New Jersey 
 1. Howard Alexander Smith (R)
 2. Albert W. Hawkes (R)

New Mexico 
 1. Dennis Chávez (D)
 2. Carl Hatch (D)

New York 
 1. James M. Mead (D)
 3. Robert F. Wagner (D)

North Carolina 
 2. Josiah Bailey (D), until December 15, 1946
 William B. Umstead (D), from December 18, 1946
 3. Clyde R. Hoey (D)

North Dakota 
 1. William Langer (R-NPL)
 3. John Moses (D), until March 3, 1945
 Milton Young (R), from March 12, 1945

Ohio 
 1. Harold H. Burton (R), until September 30, 1945
 James W. Huffman (D), October 8, 1945 – November 5, 1946
 Kingsley A. Taft (R), from November 6, 1946
 3. Robert A. Taft (R)

Oklahoma 
 2. Edward H. Moore (R)
 3. Elmer Thomas (D)

Oregon 
 2. Guy Cordon (R)
 3. Wayne Morse (R)

Pennsylvania 
 1. Joseph F. Guffey (D)
 3. Francis J. Myers (D)

Rhode Island 
 1. Peter G. Gerry (D)
 2. Theodore F. Green (D)

South Carolina 
 2. Burnet R. Maybank (D)
 3. Olin D. Johnston (D)

South Dakota 
 2. Harlan J. Bushfield (R)
 3. John Chandler Gurney (R)

Tennessee 
 1. Kenneth McKellar (D)
 2. Tom Stewart (D)

Texas 
 1. Tom Connally (D)
 2. W. Lee O'Daniel (D)

Utah 
 1. Orrice Abram Murdock Jr. (D)
 3. Elbert D. Thomas (D)

Vermont 
 1. Warren Austin (R), until August 2, 1946
 Ralph Flanders (R), from November 1, 1946
 3. George Aiken (R)

Virginia 
 1. Harry F. Byrd (D)
 2. Carter Glass (D), until May 28, 1946
 Thomas G. Burch (D), May 31, 1946 – November 5, 1946
 Absalom Willis Robertson (D), from November 6, 1946

Washington 
 1. Monrad Wallgren (D), until January 9, 1945
 Hugh Mitchell (D), January 10, 1945 – December 25, 1946
 Harry P. Cain (R), from December 26, 1946
 3. Warren Magnuson (D)

West Virginia 
 1. Harley M. Kilgore (D)
 2. Chapman Revercomb (R)

Wisconsin 
 1. Robert M. La Follette Jr. (P)
 3. Alexander Wiley (R)

Wyoming 
 1. Joseph C. O'Mahoney (D)
 2. Edward V. Robertson (R)

House of Representatives
The names of members of the House of Representatives are preceded by their district numbers.

Alabama 
 . Frank W. Boykin (D)
 . George M. Grant (D)
 . George W. Andrews (D)
 . Sam Hobbs (D)
 . Albert Rains (D)
 . Pete Jarman (D)
 . Carter Manasco (D)
 . John Sparkman (D), until November 6, 1946, vacant thereafter
 . Luther Patrick (D)

Arizona 
 . John R. Murdock (D)
 . Richard F. Harless (D)

Arkansas 
 . Ezekiel C. Gathings (D)
 . Wilbur D. Mills (D)
 . James William Trimble (D)
 . William Fadjo Cravens (D)
 . Brooks Hays (D)
 . William F. Norrell (D)
 . Oren Harris (D)

California 
 . Clarence F. Lea (D)
 . Clair Engle (D)
 . J. Leroy Johnson (R)
 . Franck R. Havenner (D)
 . Richard J. Welch (R)
 . George P. Miller (D)
 . John H. Tolan (D)
 . Jack Z. Anderson (R)
 . Bertrand W. Gearhart (R)
 . Alfred J. Elliott (D)
 . George E. Outland (D)
 . Jerry Voorhis (D)
 . Ned R. Healy (D)
 . Helen G. Douglas (D)
 . Gordon L. McDonough (R)
 . Ellis E. Patterson (D)
 . Cecil R. King (D)
 . Clyde Doyle (D)
 . Chet Holifield (D)
 . John Carl Hinshaw (R)
 . Harry R. Sheppard (D)
 . John Joseph Phillips (R)
 . Edouard V. M. Izac (D)

Colorado 
 . Dean M. Gillespie (R)
 . William S. Hill (R)
 . J. Edgar Chenoweth (R)
 . Robert F. Rockwell (R)

Connecticut 
 . Joseph F. Ryter (D)
 . Herman P. Kopplemann (D)
 . Chase G. Woodhouse (D)
 . James P. Geelan (D)
 . Clare B. Luce (R)
 . Joseph E. Talbot (R)

Delaware 
 . Philip A. Traynor (D)

Florida 
 . J. Hardin Peterson (D)
 . Emory H. Price (D)
 . Robert L. F. Sikes (D)
 . Pat Cannon (D)
 . Joe Hendricks (D)
 . Dwight L. Rogers (D)

Georgia 
 . Hugh Peterson (D)
 . Edward E. Cox (D)
 . Stephen Pace (D)
 . A. Sidney Camp (D)
 . Robert Ramspeck (D), until December 31, 1945
 Helen D. Mankin (D), from February 12, 1946
 . Carl Vinson (D)
 . Malcolm C. Tarver (D)
 . John S. Gibson (D)
 . John S. Wood (D)
 . Paul Brown (D)

Idaho 
 . Compton I. White (D)
 . Henry C. Dworshak (R), until November 5, 1946, vacant thereafter

Illinois 
 . Emily T. Douglas (D)
 . William L. Dawson (D)
 . William A. Rowan (D)
 . Edward A. Kelly (D)
 . Martin Gorski (D)
 . Adolph J. Sabath (D)
 . Thomas Joseph O'Brien (D)
 . William W. Link (D)
 . Thomas S. Gordon (D)
 . Alexander J. Resa (D)
 . Ralph E. Church (R)
 . Chauncey W. Reed (R)
 . Noah M. Mason (R)
 . Leo E. Allen (R)
 . Anton J. Johnson (R)
 . Robert B. Chiperfield (R)
 . Everett M. Dirksen (R)
 . Leslie C. Arends (R)
 . Jessie Sumner (R)
 . Rolla C. McMillen (R)
 . Sid Simpson (R)
 . George Evan Howell (R)
 . Melvin Price (D)
 . Charles W. Vursell (R)
 . James V. Heidinger (R), until March 22, 1945
 Roy Clippinger (R), from November 6, 1945
 . C. W. Bishop (R)

Indiana 
 . Ray J. Madden (D)
 . Charles A. Halleck (R)
 . Robert A. Grant (R)
 . George W. Gillie (R)
 . Forest A. Harness (R)
 . Noble J. Johnson (R)
 . Gerald W. Landis (R)
 . Charles M. LaFollette (R)
 . Earl Wilson (R)
 . Raymond S. Springer (R)
 . Louis Ludlow (D)

Iowa 
 . Thomas E. Martin (R)
 . Henry O. Talle (R)
 . John W. Gwynne (R)
 . Karl M. LeCompte (R)
 . Paul H. Cunningham (R)
 . James I. Dolliver (R)
 . Ben F. Jensen (R)
 . Charles B. Hoeven (R)

Kansas 
 . Albert McDonald Cole (R)
 . Errett P. Scrivner (R)
 . Thomas Daniel Winter (R)
 . Edward Herbert Rees (R)
 . Clifford R. Hope (R)
 . Frank Carlson (R)

Kentucky 
 . Noble J. Gregory (D)
 . Earle C. Clements (D)
 . Emmet O'Neal (D)
 . Frank Chelf (D)
 . Brent Spence (D)
 . Virgil Chapman (D)
 . Andrew J. May (D)
 . Joe B. Bates (D)
 . John M. Robsion (R)

Louisiana 
 . F. Edward Hébert (D)
 . Paul H. Maloney (D)
 . James Domengeaux (D)
 . Overton Brooks (D)
 . Charles E. McKenzie (D)
 . James H. Morrison (D)
 . Henry D. Larcade Jr. (D)
 . A. Leonard Allen (D)

Maine 
 . Robert Hale (R)
 . Margaret Chase Smith (R)
 . Frank Fellows (R)

Maryland 
 . Dudley Roe (D)
 . H. Streett Baldwin (D)
 . Thomas D'Alesandro Jr. (D)
 . George Hyde Fallon (D)
 . Lansdale G. Sasscer (D)
 . J. Glenn Beall (R)

Massachusetts 
 . John W. Heselton (R)
 . Charles Clason (R)
 . Philip Philbin (D)
 . Pehr G. Holmes (R)
 . Edith Nourse Rogers (R)
 . George J. Bates (R)
 . Thomas J. Lane (D)
 . Angier L. Goodwin (R)
 . Charles L. Gifford (R)
 . Christian Herter (R)
 . James Michael Curley (D)
 . John W. McCormack (D)
 . Richard B. Wigglesworth (R)
 . Joseph W. Martin Jr. (R)

Michigan 
 . George G. Sadowski (D)
 . Earl C. Michener (R)
 . Paul W. Shafer (R)
 . Clare E. Hoffman (R)
 . Bartel J. Jonkman (R)
 . William W. Blackney (R)
 . Jesse P. Wolcott (R)
 . Fred L. Crawford (R)
 . Albert J. Engel (R)
 . Roy O. Woodruff (R)
 . Fred Bradley (R)
 . Frank Eugene Hook (D)
 . George D. O'Brien (D)
 . Louis C. Rabaut (D)
 . John D. Dingell Sr. (D)
 . John Lesinski Sr. (D)
 . George A. Dondero (R)

Minnesota 
 . August H. Andresen (R)
 . Joseph P. O'Hara (R)
 . William Gallagher (DFL), until August 13, 1946
 . Frank Starkey (DFL)
 . Walter Judd (R)
 . Harold Knutson (R)
 . H. Carl Andersen (R)
 . William Pittenger (R)
 . Harold Hagen (R)

Mississippi 
 . John E. Rankin (D)
 . Jamie L. Whitten (D)
 . William M. Whittington (D)
 . Thomas G. Abernethy (D)
 . W. Arthur Winstead (D)
 . William M. Colmer (D)
 . Dan R. McGehee (D)

Missouri 
 . Samuel W. Arnold (R)
 . Max Schwabe (R)
 . William C. Cole (R)
 . C. Jasper Bell (D)
 . Roger C. Slaughter (D)
 . Marion T. Bennett (R)
 . Dewey Short (R)
 . A.S.J. Carnahan (D)
 . Clarence Cannon (D)
 . Orville Zimmerman (D)
 . John B. Sullivan (D)
 . Walter C. Ploeser (R)
 . John J. Cochran (D)

Montana 
 . Mike Mansfield (D)
 . James F. O'Connor (D), until January 15, 1945
 Wesley A. D'Ewart (R), from June 5, 1945

Nebraska 
 . Carl T. Curtis (R)
 . Howard H. Buffett (R)
 . Karl Stefan (R)
 . Arthur L. Miller (R)

Nevada 
 . Berkeley L. Bunker (D)

New Hampshire 
 . Charles Earl Merrow (R)
 . Sherman Adams (R)

New Jersey 
 . Charles A. Wolverton (R)
 . T. Millet Hand (R)
 . James C. Auchincloss (R)
 . D. Lane Powers (R), until August 30, 1945
 Frank A. Mathews Jr. (R), from November 6, 1945
 . Charles A. Eaton (R)
 . Clifford P. Case (R)
 . J. Parnell Thomas (R)
 . Gordon Canfield (R)
 . Harry L. Towe (R)
 . Fred A. Hartley Jr. (R)
 . Frank Sundstrom (R)
 . Robert W. Kean (R)
 . Mary T. Norton (D)
 . Edward J. Hart (D)

New Mexico 
 . Clinton P. Anderson (D), until June 30, 1945, vacant thereafter
 . Antonio M. Fernández (D)

New York 
 . Edgar A. Sharp (R)
 . Leonard W. Hall (R)
 . Henry J. Latham (R)
 . William B. Barry (D), until October 20, 1946, vacant thereafter
 . James A. Roe (D)
 . James J. Delaney (D)
 . John J. Delaney (D)
 . Joseph L. Pfeifer (D)
 . Eugene J. Keogh (D)
 . Andrew L. Somers (D)
 . James J. Heffernan (D)
 . John J. Rooney (D)
 . Donald L. O'Toole (D)
 . Leo F. Rayfiel (D)
 . Emanuel Celler (D)
 . Ellsworth B. Buck (R)
 . Joseph C. Baldwin (R)
 . Vito Marcantonio (AL)
 . Samuel Dickstein (D), until December 30, 1945
 Arthur G. Klein (D), from February 19, 1946
 . Sol Bloom (D)
 . James H. Torrens (D)
 . Adam Clayton Powell Jr. (D)
 . Walter A. Lynch (D)
 . Benjamin J. Rabin (D)
 . Charles A. Buckley (D)
 . Peter A. Quinn (D)
 . Ralph W. Gwinn (R)
 . Ralph A. Gamble (R)
 . Augustus W. Bennet (R)
 . Jay LeFevre (R)
 . Bernard W. Kearney (R)
 . William T. Byrne (D)
 . Dean P. Taylor (R)
 . Clarence E. Kilburn (R)
 . Hadwen C. Fuller (R)
 . Clarence E. Hancock (R)
 . Edwin Arthur Hall (R)
 . John Taber (R)
 . W. Sterling Cole (R)
 . George F. Rogers (D)
 . James W. Wadsworth Jr. (R)
 . Walter G. Andrews (R)
 . Edward J. Elsaesser (R)
 . John Cornelius Butler (R)
 . Daniel A. Reed (R)

North Carolina 
 . Herbert C. Bonner (D)
 . John H. Kerr (D)
 . Graham A. Barden (D)
 . Harold D. Cooley (D)
 . John Hamlin Folger (D)
 . Carl T. Durham (D)
 . J. Bayard Clark (D)
 . William O. Burgin (D), until April 11, 1946
 Eliza Jane Pratt (D), from May 25, 1946
 . Robert L. Doughton (D)
 . Joseph Wilson Ervin (D), until December 25, 1945
 Sam Ervin (D), from January 22, 1946
 . Alfred L. Bulwinkle (D)
 . Zebulon Weaver (D)

North Dakota 
 . William Lemke (R-NPL)
 . Charles R. Robertson (R)

Ohio 
 . George H. Bender (R)
 . Charles H. Elston (R)
 . William E. Hess (R)
 . Edward J. Gardner (D)
 . Robert Franklin Jones (R)
 . Cliff Clevenger (R)
 . Edward O. McCowen (R)
 . Clarence J. Brown (R)
 . Frederick C. Smith (R)
 . Homer A. Ramey (R)
 . Thomas A. Jenkins (R)
 . Walter E. Brehm (R)
 . John M. Vorys (R)
 . Alvin F. Weichel (R)
 . Walter B. Huber (D)
 . Percy W. Griffiths (R)
 . William R. Thom (D)
 . J. Harry McGregor (R)
 . Earl R. Lewis (R)
 . Michael J. Kirwan (D)
 . Michael A. Feighan (D)
 . Robert Crosser (D)
 . Frances P. Bolton (R)

Oklahoma 
 . George B. Schwabe (R)
 . William G. Stigler (D)
 . Paul Stewart (D)
 . Lyle Boren (D)
 . A. S. Mike Monroney (D)
 . Jed Johnson (D)
 . Victor Wickersham (D)
 . Ross Rizley (R)

Oregon 
 . James W. Mott (R), until November 12, 1945
 A. Walter Norblad (R), from January 18, 1946
 . Lowell Stockman (R)
 . Homer D. Angell (R)
 . Harris Ellsworth (R)

Pennsylvania 
 . William A. Barrett (D)
 . William T. Granahan (D)
 . Michael J. Bradley (D)
 . John E. Sheridan (D)
 . William J. Green Jr. (D)
 . Herbert J. McGlinchey (D)
 . James Wolfenden (R)
 . Charles L. Gerlach (R)
 . J. Roland Kinzer (R)
 . John W. Murphy (D), until July 17, 1946
 James P. Scoblick (R), from November 5, 1946
 . Daniel J. Flood (D)
 . Ivor D. Fenton (R)
 . Daniel K. Hoch (D)
 . Wilson D. Gillette (R)
 . Robert F. Rich (R)
 . Samuel K. McConnell Jr. (R)
 . Richard M. Simpson (R)
 . John C. Kunkel (R)
 . Leon H. Gavin (R)
 . Francis E. Walter (D)
 . Chester H. Gross (R)
 . D. Emmert Brumbaugh (R)
 . J. Buell Snyder (D), until February 24, 1946
 Carl Henry Hoffman (R), from May 21, 1946
 . Thomas E. Morgan (D)
 . Louis E. Graham (R)
 . Harve Tibbott (R)
 . Augustine B. Kelley (D)
 . Robert L. Rodgers (R)
 . Howard E. Campbell (R)
 . Robert J. Corbett (R)
 . James G. Fulton (R)
 . Herman P. Eberharter (D)
 . Samuel A. Weiss (D), until January 7, 1946
 Frank Buchanan (D), from May 21, 1946

Rhode Island 
 . Aime Forand (D)
 . John E. Fogarty (D), from February 7, 1945

South Carolina 
 . L. Mendel Rivers (D)
 . John J. Riley (D)
 . Butler B. Hare (D)
 . Joseph R. Bryson (D)
 . James P. Richards (D)
 . John L. McMillan (D)

South Dakota 
 . Karl E. Mundt (R)
 . Francis Case (R)

Tennessee 
 . B. Carroll Reece (R)
 . John Jennings Jr. (R)
 . C. Estes Kefauver (D)
 . Albert A. Gore Sr. (D)
 . Harold Earthman (D)
 . J. Percy Priest (D)
 . W. Wirt Courtney (D)
 . Tom J. Murray (D)
 . Jere Cooper (D)
 . Clifford Davis (D)

Texas 
 . Wright Patman (D)
 . Jesse M. Combs (D)
 . Lindley Beckworth (D)
 . Sam Rayburn (D)
 . Hatton W. Sumners (D)
 . Luther A. Johnson (D), until July 17, 1946
 Olin E. Teague (D), from August 24, 1946
 . Tom Pickett (D)
 . Albert Thomas (D)
 . Joseph J. Mansfield (D)
 . Lyndon B. Johnson (D)
 . William R. Poage (D)
 . Fritz G. Lanham (D)
 . Ed Gossett (D)
 . John E. Lyle Jr. (D)
 . Milton H. West (D)
 . R. Ewing Thomason (D)
 . Sam M. Russell (D)
 . Eugene Worley (D)
 . George H. Mahon (D)
 . Paul J. Kilday (D)
 . O. Clark Fisher (D)

Utah 
 . Walter K. Granger (D)
 . J. W. Robinson (D)

Vermont 
 . Charles A. Plumley (R)

Virginia 
 . S. Otis Bland (D)
 . Ralph Hunter Daughton (D)
 . Dave E. Satterfield Jr. (D), until February 15, 1945
 J. Vaughan Gary (D), from March 6, 1945
 . Patrick H. Drewry (D)
 . Thomas G. Burch (D), until May 31, 1946
 Thomas Bahnson Stanley (D), from November 5, 1946
 . Clifton A. Woodrum (D), until December 31, 1945
 J. Lindsay Almond (D), from January 22, 1946
 . A. Willis Robertson (D), until November 5, 1946
 Burr Harrison (D), from November 5, 1946
 . Howard W. Smith (D)
 . John W. Flannagan Jr. (D)

Washington 
 . Hugh De Lacy (D)
 . Henry M. Jackson (D)
 . Charles R. Savage (D)
 . Hal Holmes (R)
 . Walt Horan (R)
 . John M. Coffee (D)

West Virginia 
 . Matthew M. Neely (D)
 . Jennings Randolph (D)
 . Cleveland M. Bailey (D)
 . Hubert S. Ellis (R)
 . John Kee (D)
 . E. H. Hedrick (D)

Wisconsin 
 . Lawrence H. Smith (R)
 . Robert K. Henry (R), until November 20, 1946, vacant thereafter
 . William H. Stevenson (R)
 . Thaddeus Wasielewski (D)
 . Andrew J. Biemiller (D)
 . Frank B. Keefe (R)
 . Reid F. Murray (R)
 . John W. Byrnes (R)
 . Merlin Hull (P)
 . Alvin E. O'Konski (R)

Wyoming 
 . Frank A. Barrett (R)

Non-voting members 
 : Bob Bartlett (D)
 : Joseph Rider Farrington (R)
 : Carlos Peña Romulo (Lib.), until July 4, 1946
 : Jesús T. Piñero Jiménez (PPD), until September 2, 1946
 Antonio Fernós-Isern (PPD), from September 11, 1946

Changes in membership
The count below reflects changes from the beginning of this Congress.

Senate

|-
| Washington(1)
| nowrap  | Monrad Wallgren (D)
| style="font-size:80%" | Resigned January 9, 1945, after being elected Governor of Washington.Successor was appointed to serve until the next election.
| nowrap  | Hugh Mitchell (D)
| January 10, 1945
|-
| Connecticut(1)
| nowrap  | Francis T. Maloney (D)
| style="font-size:80%" | Died January 16, 1945.Successor was appointed to serve until a special election.
| nowrap  | Thomas C. Hart (R)
| February 15, 1945
|-
| Missouri(1)
| nowrap  | Harry S. Truman (D)
| style="font-size:80%" | Resigned January 17, 1945, after being elected Vice President of the United States.Successor was appointed to serve until the next election.
| nowrap  | Frank P. Briggs (D)
| January 18, 1945
|-
| North Dakota(3)
| nowrap  | John Moses (D)
| style="font-size:80%" | Died March 3, 1945.Successor was appointed to serve until a special election, which he subsequently won.
| nowrap  | Milton Young (R)
| March 12, 1945
|-
| Nevada(1)
| nowrap  | James G. Scrugham (D)
| style="font-size:80%" | Died June 23, 1945.Successor was appointed to serve until the next election.
| nowrap  | Edward P. Carville (D)
| July 25, 1945
|-
| California(1)
| nowrap  | Hiram Johnson (R)
| style="font-size:80%" | Died August 6, 1945.Successor was appointed to serve until a special election, which he subsequently won.
| nowrap  | William F. Knowland (R)
| August 26, 1945
|-
| Ohio(1)
| nowrap  | Harold H. Burton (R)
| style="font-size:80%" | Resigned September 30, 1945, after being appointed an Associate Justice of the Supreme Court of the United States.Successor was appointed to serve until a special election.
| nowrap  | James W. Huffman (D)
| October 8, 1945
|-
| Kentucky(2)
| nowrap  | Happy Chandler (D)
| style="font-size:80%" | Resigned November 1, 1945, after becoming Commissioner of Major League Baseball.Successor was appointed to serve until a special election.
| nowrap  | William A. Stanfill (R)
| November 19, 1945
|-
| Idaho(2)
| nowrap  | John W. Thomas (R)
| style="font-size:80%" | Died November 10, 1945.Successor was appointed to serve until a special election, which he subsequently lost.
| nowrap  | Charles C. Gossett (D)
| November 17, 1945
|-
| Virginia(2)
| nowrap  | Carter Glass (D)
| style="font-size:80%" | Died May 28, 1946.Successor was appointed to serve until a special election.
| nowrap  | Thomas G. Burch (D)
| May 31, 1946
|-
| Alabama(2)
| nowrap  | John H. Bankhead II (D)
| style="font-size:80%" | Died June 12, 1946.Successor was appointed to serve until a special election.
| nowrap  | George R. Swift (D)
| June 15, 1946
|-
| Vermont(1)
| nowrap  | Warren Austin (R)
| style="font-size:80%" | Resigned August 2, 1946, after being appointed United States representative on the United Nations Security Council.Successor was appointed to serve until the next election.
| nowrap  | Ralph Flanders (R)
| November 1, 1946
|-
| Florida(1)
| nowrap  | Charles O. Andrews (D)
| style="font-size:80%" | Died September 18, 1946.Successor was elected to finish term.
| nowrap  | Spessard Holland (D)
| September 25, 1946
|-
| Alabama(2)
| nowrap  | George R. Swift (D)
| style="font-size:80%" | Resigned November 5, 1946.Successor was elected to finish term.
| nowrap  | John Sparkman (D)
| November 6, 1946
|-
| Connecticut(1)
| nowrap  | Thomas C. Hart (R)
| style="font-size:80%" | Resigned November 5, 1946.Successor was elected to finish term.
| nowrap  | Raymond E. Baldwin (R)
| December 27, 1946
|-
| Kentucky(2)
| nowrap  | William A. Stanfill (R)
| style="font-size:80%" | Resigned November 5, 1946. Successor was elected to finish term
| nowrap  | John S. Cooper (R)
| November 6, 1946
|-
| Ohio(1)
| nowrap  | James W. Huffman (D)
| style="font-size:80%" | Resigned November 5, 1946. Successor was elected to finish term.
| nowrap  | Kingsley A. Taft (R)
| November 6, 1946
|-
| Virginia(2)
| nowrap  | Thomas G. Burch (D)
| style="font-size:80%" | Resigned November 5, 1946.Successor was elected to finish term.
| nowrap  | Absalom W. Robertson (D)
| November 6, 1946
|-
| Idaho(2)
| nowrap  | Charles C. Gossett (D)
| style="font-size:80%" | Resigned November 6, 1946.Successor was elected to finish term.
| nowrap  | Henry Dworshak (R)
| November 6, 1946
|-
| North Carolina(2)
| nowrap  | Josiah Bailey (D)
| style="font-size:80%" | Died December 15, 1946.Successor was appointed to serve until a special election, which he subsequently lost.
| nowrap  | William B. Umstead (D)
| December 18, 1946
|-
| Washington(1)
| nowrap  | Hugh Mitchell (D)
| style="font-size:80%" | Resigned December 25, 1946. Successor was appointed to finish the term already having to be elected the next term.
| nowrap  | Harry P. Cain (R)
| December 26, 1946
|}

House of Representatives

|- 
| 
| Vacant
| style="font-size:80%" | John E. Fogarty resigned during the previous Congress.
|  nowrap | John E. Fogarty (D)
| February 7, 1945
|- 
| 
|  nowrap| James F. O'Connor (D)
| style="font-size:80%" | Died January 15, 1945 
|  nowrap | Wesley A. D'Ewart (R)
| June 5, 1945
|- 
| 
|  nowrap| Dave E. Satterfield Jr. (D)
| style="font-size:80%" | Resigned February 15, 1945, to become general counsel and executive director of the Life Insurance Association of America
|  nowrap | J. Vaughan Gary (D)
| March 6, 1945
|- 
| 
|  nowrap| James V. Heidinger (R)
| style="font-size:80%" | Died March 22, 1945
|  nowrap | Roy Clippinger (R)
| November 6, 1945
|- 
| 
|  nowrap| Clinton P. Anderson (D)
| style="font-size:80%" | Resigned June 30, 1945, after being appointed Secretary of Agriculture
| Vacant
| Not filled this term
|- 
| 
|  nowrap| D. Lane Powers (R)
| style="font-size:80%" | Resigned August 30, 1945, to become a member of the Public Utilities Commission of New Jersey
|  nowrap | Frank A. Mathews Jr. (R)
| November 6, 1945
|- 
| 
|  nowrap| James W. Mott (R)
| style="font-size:80%" | Died November 12, 1945
|  nowrap | A. Walter Norblad (R)
| January 18, 1946
|- 
| 
|  nowrap| Joseph W. Ervin (D)
| style="font-size:80%" | Died December 25, 1945
|  nowrap | Sam Ervin (D)
| January 22, 1946
|- 
| 
|  nowrap| Samuel Dickstein (D)
| style="font-size:80%" | Resigned December 30, 1945
|  nowrap | Arthur G. Klein (D)
| February 19, 1946
|- 
| 
|  nowrap| Clifton A. Woodrum (D)
| style="font-size:80%" | Resigned December 31, 1945, to become president of the American Plant Food Council, Inc.
|  nowrap | J. Lindsay Almond (D)
| January 22, 1946
|- 
| 
|  nowrap| Robert Ramspeck (D)
| style="font-size:80%" | Resigned December 31, 1945, to become executive vice-president of the Air Transport Association
|  nowrap | Helen D. Mankin (D)
| February 12, 1946
|- 
| 
|  nowrap| Samuel A. Weiss (D)
| style="font-size:80%" | Resigned January 7, 1946, after being elected judge of Common Pleas in Allegheny County, Pennsylvania
|  nowrap | Frank Buchanan (D)
| May 21, 1946
|- 
| 
|  nowrap| J. Buell Snyder (D)
| style="font-size:80%" | Died February 24, 1946
|  nowrap | Carl H. Hoffman (R)
| May 21, 1946
|- 
| 
|  nowrap| William O. Burgin (D)
| style="font-size:80%" | Died April 11, 1946
|  nowrap | Eliza Jane Pratt (D)
| May 25, 1946
|- 
| 
|  nowrap| Thomas G. Burch (D)
| style="font-size:80%" | Resigned May 31, 1946, after being appointed to the U.S. Senate
|  nowrap | Thomas B. Stanley (D)
| November 5, 1946
|- 
| 
|  nowrap| Luther A. Johnson (D)
| style="font-size:80%" | Resigned July 17, 1946, after becoming judge of the United States Tax Court
|  nowrap | Olin E. Teague (D)
| August 24, 1946
|- 
| 
|  nowrap| John W. Murphy (D)
| style="font-size:80%" | Resigned July 17, 1946, to become judge of the US District Court for the Middle District of Pennsylvania
|  nowrap | James P. Scoblick (R)
| November 5, 1946
|- 
| 
|  nowrap| William Gallagher (DFL)
| style="font-size:80%" | Died August 13, 1946
| Vacant
| Not filled this term
|- 
| 
| Jesús T. Piñero (PPD)
| style="font-size:80%" | Resigned September 2, 1946, after being appointed Governor of Puerto Rico
| Antonio Fernós-Isern (PPD)
| September 11, 1946
|- 
| 
|  nowrap| William B. Barry (D)
| style="font-size:80%" | Died October 20, 1946
| Vacant
| Not filled this term
|- 
| 
|  nowrap| John Sparkman (D)
| style="font-size:80%" | Resigned November 6, 1946, after being elected to the U.S. Senate
| Vacant
| Not filled this term
|- 
| 
|  nowrap| Henry Dworshak (R)
| style="font-size:80%" | Resigned November 5, 1946, after being elected to the U.S. Senate
| Vacant
| Not filled this term
|- 
| 
|  nowrap| Absalom W. Robertson (D)
| style="font-size:80%" | Resigned November 5, 1946, after being elected to the U.S. Senate
|  nowrap | Burr Harrison (D)
| November 5, 1946
|- 
| 
|  nowrap| Robert K. Henry (R)
| style="font-size:80%" | Died November 20, 1946
| Vacant
| Not filled this term
|}

Committees

Senate

 Agriculture and Forestry (Chairman: Elmer Thomas; Ranking Member: Arthur Capper)
 Appropriations (Chairman: Kenneth McKellar; Ranking Member: Styles Bridges)
 Atomic Energy (Select)
 Audit and Control the Contingent Expenses of the Senate (Chairman: Scott W. Lucas; Ranking Member: Charles W. Tobey)
 Banking and Currency (Chairman: Robert F. Wagner; Ranking Member: Charles W. Tobey)
 Campaign Expenditures Investigation, 1944 (Special) (Chairman: Theodore F. Green)
 Campaign Expenditures Investigation, 1946 (Special) (Chairman: Allen J. Ellender)
 Civil Service (Chairman: Sheridan Downey; Ranking Member: William Langer)
 Civil Service Laws (Special)
 Claims (Chairman: Allen J. Ellender; Ranking Member: Arthur Capper)
 Commerce (Chairman: Josiah W. Bailey; Ranking Member: Hiram W. Johnson then Arthur H. Vandenberg)
 District of Columbia (Chairman: Theodore G. Bilbo; Ranking Member: Arthur Capper)
 Education and Labor (Chairman: James E. Murray; Ranking Member: Robert M. La Follette Jr.)
 Enrolled Bills (Chairman: N/A; Ranking Member: Clyde M. Reed)
 Expenditures in Executive Departments (Chairman: J. Lister Hill; Ranking Member: George D. Aiken)
 Finance (Chairman: Walter F. George; Ranking Member: Robert M. La Follette Jr.)
 Foreign Relations (Chairman: Tom Connally; Ranking Member: Hiram W. Johnson then Arthur Capper)
 Immigration (Chairman: Richard B. Russell; Ranking Member: Hiram W. Johnson then Chan Gurney)
 Indian Affairs (Chairman: Joseph C. O'Mahoney; Ranking Member: Robert M. La Follette Jr.)
 Interoceanic Canals (Chairman: Tom Stewart; Ranking Member: Harlan J. Bushfield)
 Interstate Commerce (Chairman: Burton K. Wheeler; Ranking Member: Wallace H. White Jr.)
 Investigate the National Defense Program (Special)
 Irrigation and Reclamation (Chairman: John H. Overton; Ranking Member: Hiram W. Johnson)
 Judiciary (Chairman: Pat McCarran; Ranking Member: Alexander Wiley)
 Library (Chairman: Alben W. Barkley; Ranking Member: Owen Brewster)
 Manufactures (Chairman: John H. Overton; Ranking Member: Robert M. La Follette Jr.)
 Military Affairs (Chairman: Elbert D. Thomas; Ranking Member: Warren R. Austin)
 Mines and Mining (Chairman: Joseph F. Guffey; Ranking Member: Clyde M. Reed)
 Naval Affairs (Chairman: David I. Walsh; Ranking Member: Hiram W. Johnson then Charles W. Tobey)
 Organization of Congress (Select)
 Patents (Chairman: Claude Pepper; Ranking Member: Wallace H. White Jr.)
 Pensions (Chairman: James M. Tunnell; Ranking Member: Henrik Shipstead)
 Petroleum Resources (Special)
 Post Office and Post Roads (Chairman: Dennis Chavez; Ranking Member: Clyde M. Reed)
 Post-War Economic Policy and Planning (Special)
 Printing (Chairman: Carl Hayden; Ranking Member: Raymond E. Willis)
 Privileges and Elections (Chairman: Theodore F. Green; Ranking Member: Styles Bridges)
 Public Buildings and Grounds (Chairman: Charles O. Andrews; Ranking Member: Robert A. Taft)
 Public Lands and Surveys (Chairman: Carl A. Hatch; Ranking Member: Chan Gurney)
 Remodeling the Senate Chamber (Special)
 Rules (Chairman: Harry F. Byrd; Ranking Member: Arthur H. Vandenberg)
 Small Business Enterprises (Special) (Chairman: James E. Murray)
 Territories and Insular Affairs (Chairman: Millard E. Tydings; Ranking Member: Arthur H. Vandenberg)
 Whole
 Wildlife Resources (Special)
 Wool Production (Special) (Chairman: Joseph C. O'Mahoney)

House of Representatives

 Accounts (Chairman: John J. Cochran; Ranking Member: Leo E. Allen)
 Agriculture (Chairman: John W. Flannagan Jr.; Ranking Member: Clifford R. Hope)
 Appropriations (Chairman: Clarence Cannon; Ranking Member: John Taber)
 Banking and Currency (Chairman: Brent Spence; Ranking Member: Jesse P. Wolcott)
 Census (Chairman: A. Leonard Allen; Ranking Member: J. Roland Kinzer)
 Civil Service (Chairman: Jennings Randolph; Ranking Member: Edward H. Rees)
 Claims (Chairman: Dan R. McGehee; Ranking Member: J. Parnell Thomas)
 Coinage, Weights and Measures (Chairman: Compton I. White; Ranking Member: Chauncey W. Reed)
 Conservation of Wildlife Resources (Select) (Chairman: A. Willis Robertson)
 Disposition of Executive Papers (Chairman: Alfred J. Elliott; Ranking Member: Bertrand W. Gearhart)
 District of Columbia (Chairman: John L. McMillan; Ranking Member: Everett M. Dirksen)
 Education (Chairman: Graham A. Barden; Ranking Member: George A. Dondero)
 Election of the President, Vice President and Representatives in Congress (Chairman: Herbert C. Bonner; Ranking Member: Ralph A. Gamble)
 Elections No.#1 (Chairman: James Domengeaux; Ranking Member: Clarence E. Hancock)
 Elections No.#2 (Chairman: Ed Gossett; Ranking Member: Gerald W. Landis)
 Elections No.#3 (Chairman: O.C. Fisher; Ranking Member: Charles A. Plumley)
 Enrolled Bills (Chairman: George F. Rogers; Ranking Member: B. Carroll Reece)
 Expenditures in the Executive Departments (Chairman: Carter Manasco; Ranking Member: Clare E. Hoffman)
 Flood Control (Chairman: William M. Whittington; Ranking Member: Charles R. Clason)
 Foreign Affairs (Chairman: Sol Bloom; Ranking Member: Charles Aubrey Eaton)
 Immigration and Naturalization (Chairman: John Lesinski; Ranking Member: Noah M. Mason)
 Indian Affairs (Chairman: Henry M. Jackson; Ranking Member: Karl E. Mundt)
 Insular Affairs (Chairman: C. Jasper Bell; Ranking Member: Richard J. Welch)
 Interstate and Foreign Commerce (Chairman: Clarence F. Lea; Ranking Member: Charles A. Wolverton)
 Invalid Pensions (Chairman: Augustine B. Kelley; Ranking Member: J. Harry McGregor)
 Investigate Acts of Executive Agencies Beyond their Scope of Authority (Select) (Chairman: Howard W. Smith)
 Irrigation and Reclamation (Chairman: John R. Murdock; Ranking Member: Dewey Jackson Short)
 Judiciary (Chairman: Hatton W. Sumners; Ranking Member: Clarence E. Hancock)
 Labor (Chairman: Mary Teresa Norton; Ranking Member: Richard J. Welch)
 Library (Chairman: Donald L. O'Toole; Ranking Member: C.W. Bishop)
 Memorials (Chairman: Antonio M. Fernandez; Ranking Member: James Heidinger then Roy Clippinger)
 Merchant Marine and Fisheries (Chairman: S. Otis Bland; Ranking Member: Richard J. Welch)
 Military Affairs (Chairman: Andrew J. May; Ranking Member: Walter G. Andrews)
 Mines and Mining (Chairman: Andrew Somers; Ranking Member: John M. Robsion)
 Naval Affairs (Chairman: Carl Vinson; Ranking Member: James W. Mott)
 Patents (Chairman: Frank Carlson; Ranking Member: Fred A. Hartley)
 Pensions (Chairman: Charles A. Buckley; Ranking Member: William H. Stevenson)
 Post Office and Post Roads (Chairman: George D. O'Brien; Ranking Member: Fred A. Hartley)
 Post-War Military Policy (Select) (Chairman: Clifton A. Woodrum)
 Post-War Economic Policy and Planning (Special) (Chairman: N/A)
 Printing (Chairman: Pete Jarman; Ranking Member: Robert F. Rich)
 Public Buildings and Grounds (Chairman: Fritz G. Lanham; Ranking Member: Pehr G. Holmes)
 Public Lands (Chairman: J. Hardin Peterson; Ranking Member: Karl M. LeCompte)
 Revision of Laws (Chairman: Eugene J. Keogh; Ranking Member: John M. Robsion)
 Rivers and Harbors (Chairman: Joseph J. Mansfield; Ranking Member: George A. Dondero)
 Roads (Chairman: J.W. Robinson; Ranking Member: Jesse P. Wolcott)
 Rules (Chairman: Adolph J. Sabath; Ranking Member: Leo E. Allen) 
 Small Business (Select) (Chairman: Wright Patman)
 Standards of Official Conduct
 Disposition of Surplus Property (Select) (Chairman: Roger C. Slaughter)
 Territories (Chairman: Hugh Peterson; Ranking Member: Homer D. Angell)
 Un-American Activities (Chairman: John S. Wood; Ranking Member: J. Parnell Thomas)
 War Claims (Chairman: Clair Engle; Ranking Member: Clare E. Hoffman)
 Ways and Means (Chairman: Robert L. Doughton; Ranking Member: Harold Knutson)
 World War Veterans' Legislation (Chairman: John E. Rankin; Ranking Member: Harold Knutson)
 Whole

Joint committees

 Atomic Energy (Chairman: Sen. Brien McMahon) 
 Arrange the Inauguration for President-elect (Chairman: Sen. Harry F. Byrd)
 Conditions of Indian Tribes (Special)
 Disposition of Executive Papers
 Investigation of the Pearl Harbor Attack
 Legislative Budget
 The Library (Chairman: Sen. Alben W. Barkley)
 Organization of Congress (Chairman: Vacant; Vice Chairman: Rep. Mike Monroney)
 Printing (Chairman: Sen. Carl Hayden; Vice Chairman: Rep. Pete Jarman)
 Reduction of Nonessential Federal Expenditures (Chairman: Sen. Harry F. Byrd; Vice Chairman: Rep. Robert L. Doughton)
 Selective Service Deferments
 Taxation (Chairman: Rep. Robert F. Doughton; Vice Chairman: Sen. Walter F. George)

Caucuses
 Democratic (House)
 Democratic (Senate)

Employees

Legislative branch agency directors
 Architect of the Capitol: David Lynn
 Attending Physician of the United States Congress: George Calver
 Comptroller General of the United States: Lindsay C. Warren
 Librarian of Congress: Luther H. Evans 
 Public Printer of the United States: Augustus E. Giegengack

Senate
 Chaplain: Frederick Brown Harris (Methodist)
 Parliamentarian: Charles Watkins
 Secretary: Edwin A. Halsey, until January 29, 1945 
 Leslie Biffle, from February 8, 1945
 Librarian: Ruskin McArdle
 Secretary for the Majority: Leslie Biffle, until February 8, 1945 
 Felton McLellan Johnston, from October 1945
 Secretary for the Minority: Carl A. Loeffler
 Sergeant at Arms: Wall Doxey

House of Representatives
 Chaplain: James Shera Montgomery (Methodist)
 Clerk: South Trimble, until November 23, 1946 
 Harry Newlin Megill, from November 23, 1946
 Doorkeeper: Ralph R. Roberts 
 Parliamentarian: Lewis Deschler
 Postmaster: Finis E. Scott
 Reading Clerks: George J. Maurer (D) and Alney E. Chaffee (R)
 Sergeant at Arms: Kenneth Romney

See also 
 1944 United States elections (elections leading to this Congress)
 1944 United States presidential election
 1944 United States Senate elections
 1944 United States House of Representatives elections
 1946 United States elections (elections during this Congress, leading to the next Congress)
 1946 United States Senate elections
 1946 United States House of Representatives elections

Notes

External links
 Clerk of the House of Representatives

References